Vasilios Triantafyllakos (born 16 July 1991) is a Greek professional footballer who plays as a midfielder for Ilioupoli.

Career

Aris

Triantafyllakos made his debut for Aris as a substitute in the match against rivals, PAOK in Kleanthis Vikelidis stadium. In two consecutive matches (against Levadiakos and Skoda Xanthi) he was the best player of the team at both. He scored his first goal with Aris against Panionios in Kleanthis Vikelidis.
Though he started his career as centre forward during the 2012–13 season he was established as a second striker making 19 appearances and scoring once.

Club statistics

References

1991 births
Living people
Greek footballers
Aris Thessaloniki F.C. players
Panthrakikos F.C. players
Olympiacos Volos F.C. players
Panserraikos F.C. players
Super League Greece players
Super League Greece 2 players
Association football midfielders
Footballers from Serres